"" is Nakabayashi May's fourth official single, released under stage name Sheryl Nome starring May'n. "Diamond Crevasse" was used as the second ending theme and "Iteza☆Gogo Kuji Don't be late" was used as an insert song for popular mecha anime Macross Frontier.

Single track listing

Charts

References

2008 singles
Macross
Victor Entertainment singles